Oleg Vinogradov (born 28 April 1984) is an Estonian rower. He competed in the men's quadruple sculls event at the 2004 Summer Olympics.

References

1984 births
Living people
Estonian male rowers
Olympic rowers of Estonia
Rowers at the 2004 Summer Olympics
Sportspeople from Pärnu
Estonian people of Russian descent